Sakshaug is a village in the municipality of Inderøy in Trøndelag county, Norway. The village is considered part of the Straumen urban area by Statistics Norway, so no separate population statistics are tracked.

The Old Sakshaug Church is located on the eastern edge of the village, and the newer Sakshaug Church lies a little farther to the east, closer to Straumen.  The Norwegian County Road 755 runs through the village.

References

Villages in Trøndelag
Inderøy